Drumcalpin is the name of three townlands in County Cavan, Ireland, with one situated in the civil parishes of Annagh, Castleterra, and Larah.

Drumcalpin, Annagh
The townland of Drumcalpin in the civil parish of Annagh is in the electoral district of Carrafin. It is also situated in the former barony of Loughtee Lower (or Lower Loughtee).

Drumcalpin, Castleterra
The townland of Drumcalpin in the civil parish of Castleterra is in the electoral district of Ballyhaise. It is also situated in the former barony of Castlerahan.

Drumcalpin, Larah
The townland of Drumcalpin in the civil parish of Larah is in the electoral district of Larah North (or Laradh North). It is also situated in the former barony of Tullygarvey.

Among the notable people from Drumcalpin is His Eminence Seán Cardinal Brady (born 1939), who served as the Archbishop of Armagh, Primate of All Ireland, and head of the Catholic Church in Ireland from 1996 to 2014, and who was created a cardinal in 2007.

References

External links
The IreAtlas Townland Data Base

Townlands of County Cavan